Ricardo Adrián Roach González (born 12 October 1972) is a retired Chilean athlete who specialised in the sprinting events. He represented his country in the 200 metres at the 2000 Summer Olympics, as well as 1995 and 1999 World Championships failing to reach the second round.
In addition, he won several medals at regional level.

He has a twin brother, Rodrigo Roach, who was also a sprinter.

Competition record

Personal bests
100 metres – 10.21 (+0.9 m/s) (Bogotá 1999)
200 metres – 20.60 (+1.3 m/s) (Santiago 1998)
400 metres – 45.92 (Santiago 1998) NR

References

1972 births
Living people
Chilean male sprinters
Athletes (track and field) at the 2000 Summer Olympics
Athletes (track and field) at the 1999 Pan American Games
Olympic athletes of Chile
Pan American Games competitors for Chile
South American Games gold medalists for Chile
South American Games medalists in athletics
Competitors at the 1998 South American Games
20th-century Chilean people
21st-century Chilean people